Cyphipelta is a genus of Australian hoverflies.

Species
C. conifrons Bigot, 1859
C. rufocyanea (Walker, 1835)

References

Hoverfly genera
Eristalinae
Taxa named by Jacques-Marie-Frangile Bigot